Saigon Bridge, known as Newport Bridge before 1975, is a bridge crossing the Saigon River, connecting Bình Thạnh District and District 2, Ho Chi Minh City, on the Hanoi Highway. The bridge has four lanes for cars and two lanes for motorcycles and bicycles. It was the only bridge linking District 1 to the new Thu Thiem New Urban Area in District 2 until the Thủ Thiêm Bridge opened in 2008 and the Saigon River Tunnel opened in 2011. The bridge was one of the most vital gateways for vehicles traveling from northern and central Vietnam to the city, and therefore was a key point of contention during the Tet Offensive in 1968 and the Fall of Saigon in 1975. In 2013, a new parallel bridge, Saigon 2 Bridge, was opened to ease congestion on the bridge.

Vietnam War
On 5 May 1968 during the May or "mini-Tet" Offensive, a 300-man Vietcong (VC) regiment attacked the bridge and the adjacent Newport dock facility but were driven off by Army of the Republic of Vietnam (ARVN) forces. On the morning of 12 May VC gunners from the 4th Thu Duc Battalion scored a direct hit on the bridge with a recoilless rifle, sending a chunk of steel-reinforced concrete almost sixty meters long and half the width of the bridge crashing into the river. The VC then promptly packed up his weapons and hustled away before helicopter gunships could retaliate. For the Allies, the damage inflicted on the bridge proved to be little more than an inconvenience. The temporary loss of one lane did not seriously impede traffic, and over the next four weeks engineers repaired the otherwise intact bridge.

By 28 April 1975 as the People's Army of Vietnam (PAVN) continued their advance on Saigon, the Vietcong seized the Thảo Điền area at the eastern end of the bridge and attempted to seize the bridge but were repulsed by the ARVN 12th Airborne Battalion. On the morning of 30 April PAVN sappers attempted to seize the bridge but were repulsed by the ARVN Airborne. At 09:00 the PAVN tank column approached the bridge and came under fire from ARVN tanks which destroyed the lead T-54, killing the PAVN Battalion commander. The ARVN and PAVN continued to exchange tank and artillery fire until 10:24, when the ARVN commander received President Dương Văn Minh's capitulation order over the radio. While the bridge was rigged with approximately 4000lbs of demolition charges, the ARVN stood down and at 10:30 the PAVN column crossed the bridge.

References

External links
Video showing damage to the bridge caused by a Vietcong sapper attack in May 1968
AP report of fighting at the bridge in April 1975

Transport in Ho Chi Minh City
Buildings and structures in Ho Chi Minh City
Road bridges in Vietnam
Bridges over the Saigon River
Bridges completed in 1961